Alyssa Baldin (born February 15, 1990) is an elite women's ice hockey player who has also competed for the Canada women's national inline hockey team. With regards to Baldin's women's ice hockey career, she has competed at the university level in both the NCAA and CIS. Acquired by the Toronto Furies in the 2013 CWHL Draft, she would capture the Clarkson Cup in 2014.

Playing career

Ice hockey
For the 2007 National Women's Under-18 Championships, she was selected to Team Ontario Blue.

NCAA
Joining the Wayne State Warriors in autumn 2008, Baldin scored her first career goal on October 18, 2008 at Union. It was also her first collegiate point. She finished 8th among CHA rookies with 18 point (seventh highest by any freshman in Warriors history).

On October 15, 2010, Baldin scored her 20th career goal in NCAA play. With the goal, she moves into a tie for ninth all-time in Wayne State Warriors women's ice hockey history. On November 13, 2010, she earned her first career hat trick as Wayne State bested Robert Morris by a 4-1 tally. The goal she scored in the second period proved to be the game-winning goal, as she became the Warrior since Melissa Boal to register a hat trick.

On May 11, 2011, she was named team captain for the Wayne State Warriors upcoming season. Of note, she was the last captain in the history of the Wayne State Warriors, as the 2011–12 Wayne State Warriors women's ice hockey season was cancelled. At the time that the Warriors program was dissolved, she was the Warriors active scoring leader (while ranking seventh all-time in career points).

CIS
Baldin joined the University of Windsor Lancers women's ice hockey program in the autumn of 2011 after Wayne State discontinued its women's ice hockey program. In her first season with the Lancers, Baldin ranked in the top 20 in Ontario University Athletics for most goals scored and the top 10 for power play goals. Heading into the 2012-13 season (her final one with Windsor), she was named the team captain.

CWHL
The Toronto Furies selected Baldin in the fifth round, 22nd overall in the 2013 CWHL Draft. She would score a goal and get an assist in her CWHL debut with the Furies, a November 9, 2013 win against the Calgary Inferno, garnering First Star of the Game honors. On two separate occasions in the 2013-14 season, she tallied four-point games. She would finish the season as the Furies leading scorer among rookies in points, also tying with Carolyne Prevost for first overall in team scoring and pacing all Furies in assists with 15, respectively.

During the 2015-16 CWHL season, Baldin was named an alternate captain with the Toronto Furies. Of note, she would score the first game-winning goal of her CWHL career, and would also register her first career CWHL playoff points.

Inline hockey
Baldin made her debut for the Canadian national team at the 2016 FIRS Inline Hockey World Championship in Italy. She would contribute to Canada emerging from the event with the gold medal. Baldin would finish the tournament as one of Canada's five leading scorers. As a side note, Furies teammate Michelle Bonello was also part of the Canadian gold medal winning roster.

Career stats

NCAA

CIS
This is an incomplete list

CWHL

Playoffs

FIRS Worlds

Awards and honours
2014 Clarkson Cup

References

External links
 

1990 births
Canadian women's ice hockey forwards
Canadian women's national inline hockey team players
Clarkson Cup champions
College Hockey America players
Ice hockey people from Ontario
Living people
Sportspeople from Mississauga
Toronto Furies players
Wayne State Warriors women's ice hockey
Wayne State Warriors athletes